Old North Arabian is a Unicode block containing characters for writing the Ancient North Arabian language.

U+10A9D OLD NORTH ARABIAN NUMBER ONE (𐪝) represents both the numeral one and a word divider.

History
The following Unicode-related documents record the purpose and process of defining specific characters in the Old North Arabian block:

References 

Unicode blocks

External Links 
 Noto Sans Old North Arabian font